Mister Bee Potato Chips is an American brand of potato chips produced in Parkersburg, West Virginia, the only potato chip manufacturer in West Virginia. Founded in 1951 by Leo and Sara Klein as a small local business, the company was family-owned until 2010. It is now incorporated as West Virginia Potato Chip Company, LLC, and since 2015 has been owned by Mary Anne Ketelson and partners.

History
Leo and Sara Klein founded Mister Bee Potato Chips in 1951, initially making the chips in the morning and delivering them in the afternoon. The company moved to its current site in 1962 and was a million-dollar company by the end of 1972. Leo Klein was succeeded as head of the company in 1979 by his son Alan, who took the title of CEO in 1988, and by 2010 Alan Klein's son Doug was President and COO.

In 2010, the company experienced financial difficulties after losing distribution contracts. In late 2011, production was reduced and then stopped and the company entered Chapter 11 bankruptcy. In 2012 it was purchased by Randall Holden and James Richard Barton, and Christie Mallett replaced Doug Klein as company president. Holden subsequently took over as president. After a fire damaged the production plant in March 2013, the company renovated.

Mister Bee Potato Chip Company became West Virginia Potato Chip Company by 2013. In September 2015 it was purchased by Mary Anne (Welch) Ketelsen, Douglas Ketelsen, James Richard Barton, Gregory Barton, and Gregory Reed, and additional financing from Mary Maxine Welch. Reed became president. Mary Anne Ketelson, as majority owner, took over operations in 2018 and new equipment was installed that made possible an increase in production. An expansion of the plant received initial approval in 2020.  the company had 47 employees.

Products and distribution
West Virginia Potato Chip Company is the only remaining potato chip manufacturer in West Virginia, and formerly used the slogan "200 miles fresher" to emphasize that its chips were not shipped into the state from elsewhere. It sells Mister Bee potato chips in West Virginia, Ohio, and Kentucky as well as online; in July–September 2021, distribution was expanded temporarily to Washington, D.C., Maryland, and Virginia.  it produces eight varieties of potato chips, original, sour cream and onion, barbecue, dip style, cheddar sour cream, honey barbecue, jalapeño, and salt and vinegar, and also potato sticks; it also produces chips for other brands.

See also
 List of brand name snack foods

References

External links 
 Mister Bee Potato Chips

Brand name snack foods
Products introduced in 1951
Manufacturing companies based in West Virginia
Wood County, West Virginia